Max Davidson  is  a former Australian rules footballer who played with Collingwood in the Victorian Football League (VFL).

Notes

External links 		
		
			
		
		
		
1934 births		
		
Australian rules footballers from Tasmania		
Collingwood Football Club players
North Launceston Football Club players
Living people